The Seven Ranges (also known as the Old Seven Ranges) was a land tract in eastern Ohio that was the first tract to be surveyed in what became the Public Land Survey System. It consists of all of Monroe, Harrison, Belmont and Jefferson, and portions of Carroll, Columbiana, Tuscarawas, Guernsey, Noble, and Washington County.

History
Acquired by Great Britain from France following the 1763 Treaty of Paris, the Ohio Country had been closed to white settlement by the Proclamation of 1763.  The United States claimed the region after the 1783 Treaty of Paris that ended the American Revolutionary War. In spite of the prohibition on settlement, a number of squatters moved into the land north of the Ohio River making settlements in Tiltonsville, Martins Ferry and other places, who were removed by force by the federal government.  The Congress passed the Land Ordinance of 1785 as a formal means of surveying, selling, and settling the land and raising revenue.  Land was to be systematically surveyed into square "townships", six miles (9.656 km) on a side created by lines running north-south intersected by east-west lines.  Townships were to be arranged in north-south rows called ranges. These townships were sub-divided into thirty-six "sections" of one square mile (2.59 km2) or 640 acres. These ranges, townships, and sections were to be systematically numbered.

The first north-south line, Eastern Ohio Meridian, was to be the western boundary of Pennsylvania, sometimes called Ellicott's Line after Andrew Ellicott, who had been in charge of surveying it, and the first east-west line (called the Geographer's Line or Base Line) was to begin where the Pennsylvania boundary touched the north bank of the Ohio River, the Beginning Point of the U.S. Public Land Survey . The Geographer's Line was to extend westward through "the whole territory" which at that time was meant to include lands lying between the Ohio River and Lake Erie.

The Geographer of the United States, Thomas Hutchins, was to make a return of the survey after each seven ranges had been completed, at which time the Secretary of War was to choose by lot one seventh of the land to compensate veterans of the Continental army. The rest of the lots were to be sold at auction in New York, then the nation's capital. A section (one square mile or 640 acres) was the smallest unit for sale, and some townships were to be sold in their entirety. The minimum price was one dollar per acre to be paid in cash or in land warrants of equivalent value. No land would be sold on credit.

The 1785 act called for one surveyor to be appointed by Congress from each state:
 New Hampshire - initially Nathaniel Adams, who resigned, and was replaced by Winthrop Sargent;
 Massachusetts - initially Rufus Putnam, who was surveying the lands of Maine and unavailable, and was replaced by Benjamin Tupper;
 Rhode Island - initially Caleb Harris, who resigned, and was replaced by Ebenezer Sproat;
 New York - William Morris;
 Pennsylvania - Adam Hoopes;
 Maryland - James Simpson;
 Virginia - Alex Parker;
 North Carolina - Absalom Tatom;
 South Carolina - William Tate;
 Connecticut - Isaac Sherman.

Survey

Process
After passage of the act, on May 27, 1785, Hutchins was appropriated funds and made arrangements. He arrived in Pittsburgh on September 3, and wrote a letter to the President of Congress noting that the requirement of the act for equal square townships could not be strictly met on a nearly spherical planet. Hutchins began the survey of the Geographer's Line on September 30. On October 8, word was received of an Indian attack on the Tuscarawas River. He and his men were scared, and returned to Pittsburgh after only a few miles of the Geographers Line had been completed. Hutchins returned to New York that autumn.

Hutchins arrived in Pittsburgh July 25, 1786.  He and his men resumed their survey on August 5, and by September, 1786, they placed a stone completing the Geographer's Line at a place near Magnolia called the Seven Ranges Terminus .  Under protection from Indians by troops housed at the newly constructed Fort Steuben, the group completed four ranges, and forty two miles of the west side of the fifth range that autumn.  The first and second ranges had been surveyed into townships by Captain Martin, and the third and fourth ranges by General Tupper, Colonel Sproat, Colonel Sherman, and Mr. Simpson. Hutchins submitted a plat of the first four ranges to Congress spring, 1787.  In June 1787, Hutchins asked a leave of absence that was granted, and the surveyors of the previous year continued the survey. Israel Ludlow completed the seventh range, with the southwest corner  a few miles up the Ohio river from Marietta, Ohio, followed by James Simpson in the sixth range and Absalom Martin in the fifth.  Those three returned to New York, where, with Hutchins, they completed their report.  Hutchins submitted the general plan, concluding notes, and plats to the board of treasury on July 26, 1788. In 1788, Hutchins began surveying additional lands on September 2, but fell ill and returned to Pittsburgh, where he died April 28, 1789, his survey incomplete.

The original survey set stones at one mile (1.6 km) intervals along the four sides of each township, and did not venture to the interior.  The individual sections were not completely surveyed until 1806.

Numbering
The sections of each survey township are numbered according to the plan of the Land Ordinance of 1785. The Ranges are numbered starting from Ellicott's Line working westward.  Townships are numbered starting from the southernmost township or partial township in each range, and numbering northward toward the Geographers line, a system called the Ohio River Base. Thus, townships next to one another do not have the same number due to the irregularity of the Ohio River's course, with the townships adjacent to the Geographer's Line numbered 5, 9, 12, 13, 14, 15, and 16 in ranges 1 to 7. This deficiency was corrected outside of Ohio by numbering from a baseline.

Land Sales

Public sales began in 1787 in New York, and were continued in Philadelphia, Pittsburgh, and Steubenville, Ohio.  Difficulties with Indians continued in the area until the Treaty of Greenville in 1795, and settlement was slow.  Steubenville was founded in 1797, and the Federal Land Office there opened in 1801.  The Steubenville Land Office was responsible for sales in the northern part of the tract, within  of the Geographer's Line.  The Marietta Land Office sold lands in the southern part.  The General Land Office in the nation's capital also sold land.  Local offices were eventually closed.  The area was settled mostly by Pennsylvanians and Virginians.  Section 16 of each survey township was set aside for public education as School Lands.  Knepper notes: "Sections number 8, 11, 26, and 29 in every township were reserved for future sale by the federal government when, it was hoped, they would bring higher prices because of developed land around them. Congress also reserved one third part of all gold, silver, lead, and copper mines to its own use, a bit of wishful thinking as regards Ohio lands."

Dohrman Tract
Arnold Henry Dohrman helped the American cause in the revolutionary war at great expense while living in Portugal.  Unable to fully compensate him monetarily, Congress granted him township 13 of range 7 in what became known as the Dohrman Tract or Dohrman's Grant, now a part of Harrison and Tuscarawas Counties.

Ephraim Kimberly Grant

The Ephraim Kimberly Grant was a  land tract in township 4 of range 2 of the Seven Ranges that was granted to an American Revolutionary War veteran by Congress late in the 18th century.

Legacy

The plan to return plats to Congress after each seven ranges was abandoned after the first seven. The 1785 section numbering plan was subsequently used for the privately surveyed Symmes Purchase and, with some modifications, by the privately surveyed Ohio Company of Associates.  A different system was established for later surveys.The system of numbering townships north from the Ohio River Base, and ranges west from Pennsylvania was used for the Ohio Company of Associates, Congress Lands North of Old Seven Ranges and Congress Lands East of Scioto River.A point on the west boundary of the Seven Ranges fifty miles south of the Geographer's Line is the meridian for the United States Military District.

See also
Ohio Lands
Historic regions of the United States

Notes

References

External links

Former regions and territories of the United States
Geography of Ohio
Pre-statehood history of Ohio
History of the Midwestern United States
1785 in the United States
Surveying of the United States
Northwest Territory
Geography of Belmont County, Ohio
Geography of Carroll County, Ohio
Geography of Columbiana County, Ohio
Geography of Guernsey County, Ohio
Geography of Harrison County, Ohio
Geography of Jefferson County, Ohio
Geography of Monroe County, Ohio
Geography of Noble County, Ohio
Geography of Tuscarawas County, Ohio
Geography of Washington County, Ohio